The Bockkarkopf is a mountain, 2,609 m high, and part of the main ridge of the Allgäu Alps. It is the ninth highest peak in the Allgäu Alps and is located between the Wilder Mann to the southwest and the Hochfrottspitze to the northeast. The busy Heilbronn Way (Heilbronner Weg) runs over the pyramidal peak.

The Bavarian border with Tyrol runs over the summit.

Ascent 

The Bockkarkopf is usually only climbed from the Heilbronn Way. As a destination in itself it can be climbed in a circular tour from the Waltenberger Haus via the Hintere Bockkar and the Socktalscharte. The return journey to the mountain hut follows via the Bockkarscharte and the Vordere Bockkar. The tour can also be done in reverse.

Sources

Dieter Seibert: Allgäuer Alpen Alpin, Alpenvereinsführer. München, Bergverlag Rudolf Rother 2004. 
Alpenvereinskarte 1:25.000, Blatt 2/1, Allgäuer- Lechtaler Alpen, West

External links 

 Tour description and photographs of the Bockkarkopf

Mountains of the Alps
Allgäu Alps
Mountains of Bavaria
Mountains of Tyrol (state)
Two-thousanders of Austria
Oberallgäu
Two-thousanders of Germany